Konaran (also Romanized as Konārān and Kenārān; also known as Kenārū) is a village in Shamil Rural District, Takht District, Bandar Abbas County, Hormozgan Province, Iran. At the 2006 census, its population was 124, in 22 families.

References 

Populated places in Bandar Abbas County